The year 1740 in science and technology involved some significant events.

Mathematics
 Jean Paul de Gua de Malves publishes his work of analytic geometry, .

Metallurgy
 Benjamin Huntsman develops the technique of crucible steel production at Handsworth, South Yorkshire, England.

Physics
 Jacques-Barthélemy Micheli du Crest creates a spirit thermometer, making use of two fixed points, 0 for "Temperature of earth" based on a cave at Paris Observatory and 100 for the heat of boiling water.
 Émilie du Châtelet publishes Institutions de Physique, including a demonstration that the energy of a moving object is proportional to the square of its velocity (Ek = mv²).
 Louis Bertrand Castel publishes L'Optique des couleurs in Paris, including the observation that the colours of white light split by a prism depend on distance from the prism.

Technology
 Henry Hindley of Yorkshire invents a device to cut the teeth of clock wheels.

Awards
 Copley Medal: Alexander Stuart

Births
 February 17 – Horace Bénédict de Saussure, Genevan pioneer of Alpine studies (died 1799)
 March 28 (bapt.) – James Small, Scottish inventor (died 1793)
 June 27 – John Latham, English physician and naturalist, "grandfather of Australian ornithology" (died 1837)
 July 1 – Franz-Joseph Müller von Reichenstein, Austrian mineralogist and discoverer of tellurium (died 1825)
 August 26 – Joseph Michel Montgolfier, French pioneer balloonist (died 1810)
 September 29 – Thomas Percival, English reforming physician and medical ethicist (died 1804)
 December 24 – Anders Johan Lexell, Finnish-Swedish astronomer and mathematician (died 1784)
 unknown – William Smellie, Scottish naturalist and encyclopedist (died 1795)

Deaths
 March 23 – Olof Rudbeck the Younger, Swedish naturalist (born 1660).

References

 
18th century in science
1740s in science